Boont can refer to a few different things:

Boontling, the language spoken in Boonville, Northern California
Boonville resident
 Boont ale  from Boonville